Kim Sang-man (born January 28, 1970) is a South Korean film director and art director.

Career
Kim Sang-man began his career in films designing posters, starting with The Contact in 1997. He had designed posters for about 30 films when he was given the opportunity to be the art director on If the Sun Rises in the West in 1998. The highlight of his career as an art director came two years after that when he worked on the now-classic Joint Security Area. Some time afterwards, Kim joined a band as a bassist and recorded under an independent label. Because of this, in the next film he worked on, Bloody Tie in 2006, he held two positions: art director and film score composer/music director. In 2008, he directed his first film, the crime caper/comedy Girl Scout which was fairly well received. He wrote and directed his sophomore feature, the 2010 thriller Midnight FM. Kim reunited with Midnight FM actor Yoo Ji-tae for his third film The Tenor – Lirico Spinto, a 2014 biopic of South Korean tenor Bae Jae-chul.

Filmography

As director
The Tenor – Lirico Spinto (2014) - director, screenplay
Midnight FM (2010) - director, screenplay
Girl Scout (2008) - director, music

As art director
Bloody Tie (2006) - art director, music, sound department
Joint Security Area (2000) - art director
Happy End (1999) - art director
If the Sun Rises in the West (1998) - art director

As crew

Battlefield Heroes (2011) - art department
Paju (2009) 
Voice of a Murderer (2007) 
My Wife Is a Gangster 3 (2006) 
The Restless (2006) 
I'm a Cyborg, But That's OK (2006) 
The Fox Family (2006) 
The Host (2006)  
Barefoot Ki-bong (2006) 
Blue Swallow (2005) 
Typhoon (2005) 
Bystanders (2005) 
Love Talk (2005) 
Blossom Again (2005) 
You Are My Sunshine (2005) 
Short Time (2005) 
Sympathy for Lady Vengeance (2005) 
Heaven's Soldiers (2005) 
Voice (2005) 
Rules of Dating (2005) 
A Bold Family (2005) 
Hello, Brother (2005) 
Blood Rain (2004) 
The President's Last Bang (2005) 
A Moment to Remember (2004) 
Bunshinsaba (2004) 
The President's Barber (2004) 
The Big Swindle (2004) 
Dance with Solitude (Sweet Sixties) (2004) 
A Good Lawyer's Wife (2003) 
Who R U? (2002) 
L'Abri (Bus Stop) (2001)

References

External links
 
 
 

South Korean film directors
1970 births
Living people